MV Protektor was a bulk cargo ship that sank in the North Atlantic Ocean in January 1991 with the loss of her entire crew.

Protektor was built by Flender Werke in Lübeck, Germany. She was launched on 17 December 1966 and delivered on 22 March 1967, bearing the name Ursula Schulte and sailing under the German flag. In 1978, she was renamed Protektor, and was registered in Singapore at the time of her loss.

Early on the morning of 13 January, the crew made a distress call indicating that the ship's cargo hold had been breached and she was taking on water, leading the crew to prepare to abandon ship. The Canadian Air Force dispatched a search plane, but radio contact was lost with Protektor before she was ever located. A search effort continued, but with severe weather remaining in the area it was called off at the end of the following day, with all 33 crew members presumed dead.

References

Maritime incidents in 1991
1966 ships
Bulk carriers
Ships built in Lübeck